In Norse mythology, Gram (Old Norse Gramr, meaning "Wrath"), also known as Balmung or Nothung,  is the sword that Sigurd used to kill the dragon Fafnir. It is primarily used by the Völsungs in the Volsunga Saga. However, it is also seen in other legends, such as the Thidrekssaga in 
which it is wielded by Hildebrand. 

Depending on the story and source material, Gram may have other names. In The Nibelungenlied it is named Balmung. In Richard Wagner's work, Der Ring des Nibelungen (The Ring of the Nibelung), it is referred to as Nothung.

Description
Nowhere in the Volsunga Saga is a clear description of Gram given, but there is enough scattered throughout the story to draw a picture of the sword. Sigurd's weapons, Gram included, are described as being "all decked with gold and gleaming bright". Depending on how the text is read, the sword may or may not have a dragon emblazoned on it and/or depending on the translation have been "brown of hue".

History

Gram is primarily seen in the Volsunga Saga used by men in the Volsung line after Sigmund. Sigmund receives it during the wedding feast for his sister, Signy. Part of the way through the feast a strange man appears carrying a sword. Although unknown to Sigmund, this is the god Odin. He thrusts the sword into the Barnstokkr tree that grew in the middle of the hall and said, “The man to pull out this sword from the trunk shall receive it from me as a gift and he will find out for himself that he never bore in hand a better sword than this.” Soon after he departed every man made his attempt to pull the sword out of the wood. All fail except Sigmund, who easily extracts it. The sword is a fine sword, and King Siggeir is covetous of it, offering Sigmund three times its weight in gold. When he refuses, King Siggeir grows angry and secretly begins plotting to steal it from Sigmund, eventually killing his father and capturing him and all of his brothers. After this, the sword disappears from the narrative until Signy secretly gives it back to Sigmund as he is buried alive with Sinfjotli. After Sigmund avenges his family, he uses the sword in several battles before it is eventually broken by Odin during Sigmund's final battle with King Lyngvi. Hjördis, Sigmund's wife, takes up the two halves of the blade and keeps them for Sigurd, their son.

After Gram was broken by Odin, Hjördis took the two halves and kept them for her future son. Soon after the dwarven smith, Regin, comes and begins teaching Sigurd. After a period of time, he tells Sigurd of the mighty dragon, Fafnir, and the treasure which it guards, asking Sigurd to slay it for him. Sigurd agrees on one condition: that Regin makes him a mighty sword capable of slaying such a monster.

Regin confidently makes Sigurd an admirable sword, but when Sigurd sees it, he is disappointed and breaks it over the anvil. On his second attempt, Regin makes him a sword superior to the last, but it also breaks. On his third attempt, Sigurd brings Regin the two halves of Gram, his father's sword, and when he strikes the anvil with Gram, it is cloven in two. Once he tested the strength of the sword, he left the workshop and went to a nearby stream to check its edge. Throwing a piece of wool upstream, he lets it press against Gram, causing it to be sliced through. After testing the blade's sharpness, he uses it to avenge his father, Sigmund, slaying King Lyngvi. Of the many feats done by Gram, by far the most well-known and important is the slaying of Fafnir the dragon. This deed is accomplished by Sigurd with a single, mighty thrust to the left shoulder where he drives the sword so deep he gets his arms bloodied up to the shoulder. Eventually, Gram is used as a sign of chastity when it is placed between Sigurd and Brynhild on their funeral pyre after Brynhild arranged Sigurd's death before killing herself in turn. After this, the sword is no longer found in the manuscript.

In Der Ring des Nibelungen
In Siegfried, the third of the four operas in the Ring des Nibelungen cycle, Mime, who essentially takes Regin's part, is unable to reforge Nothung (as Gram is called in the Ring). Siegfried, however, manages. Apart from this, the story of Regin and Sigurd is more or less identical to that of Mime and Siegfried.

In popular culture

In Ulysses by James Joyce, Stephen Dedalus is confronted by a vision of his dead mother's corpse in a brothel. He uses his ashplant walking stick to smash a chandelier and dispel the hallucination, crying out Nothung! as he does so.

The sword is featured in the 2017 video game Hellblade: Senua's Sacrifice, where it is found and used in combat by the main character, Senua. The sword's origins are explained to the character by her friend Druth, including the story of Sigmund and Sigurd.

In the Castlevania series of video games, Gram is a one-handed sword (Symphony of the Night, Aria of Sorrow and Harmony of Despair), while Balmung is a two-handed great sword (Aria of Sorrow, Dawn of Sorrow and Portrait of Ruin).

A powerful magical sword named Balmung appears in the real-time tactics video game Myth II: Soulblighter.

Gram is a heavy blade (two-handed sword) in the game Warframe, the sword also has a variant with better attributes called Gram Prime.

Gram (under the name "Nothung") appears in the Cartoon Network animated series Adventure Time as the sword wielded by the legendary hero Billy.

"Gram, the Sword of Grief" appears as a two-handed sword in the game Baldur's Gate II: Throne of Bhaal, specifically dropped by the dragon Abazigal (one of the half-siblings of the protagonist). Its description mentions it as being one of the many weapons of the great hero Siegfried.

Philosopher Ludwig Wittgenstein refers to Gram (using the name "Nothung") in his work Philosophical Investigations.

Gram is wielded by Siegfried in the Soul Calibur series.

Gram is wielded by Kohri in the game Phantasy Star Online 2.

In Konosuba, Mitsurugi Kyouya was given the "Cursed Sword Gram" by Aqua and, at one point, used it to slay a dragon.

In the series Highschool DxD, Gram is one of the legendary demon swords, alongside Balmung and Nothung, being considered the most powerful demon swords. Gram was used by the original Siegfried to kill the Norse Dragon King Fafnir; it wasthen passed down to Siegfried's artificial descendant Siegfried and Gram's ownership was transferred to Kiba Yuuto after Siegfried was defeated.

In the game Fate/Grand Order, Gram is wielded by Sigurd (as a reforged version) and Siegfried (under the name Balmung).

Gram can be obtained by sending characters on missions in the game Brigandine: Legend of Forsena. Once obtained, it can be equipped by Knight, Paladin, and Avenger classes.

Gram is a huge two-handed sword in the game The Last Remnant; only Yama characters can wield it.

In the game Fire Emblem: Genealogy of the Holy War, the character named Od (which is another reference on Norse mythology, see Óðr) has one of the twelve holy weapons named Balmung.

Gram is the name of dukedom on the large island kingdom in the game Tear Ring Saga.

In the anime series Sword Art Online (specifically in the second arc of season 1, also known as Fairy Dance Arc) the sword Gram appears in Alfheim Online wielded as a two-handed sword named "Demonic Sword Gram." It has the ability "Ethereal Shift" which allows the sword to phase through a weapon or shield that is blocking an attack from the demonic sword, but the ability has a cooldown.

In the game Final Fantasy XIV, Gram (as Nothung) is a stage of the Anima Weapon upgrade line for the Dark Knight class.

In Book V in Fire Emblem Heroes, the Order of Heroes searches for a sword called Gramr to slay Fáfnir, the King of Niðavellir. The sword was given to the Jötnar of Jötunheimr as a gift in the name of peace.

References

Mythological Norse weapons
Mythological swords
Völsung cycle